Din has been used as both a surname and given name. Din in Arabic means "religion" or "way of life". Din is also a component of longer names, especially in Arabic. For example, Aladdin or ʻAlāʼ ad-Dīn means "nobility of religion". See ad-Din for a list of these names. Notable people with the name include:

Given name
 Din Beramboi (1966–2010), Malaysian comedian, actor and radio DJ
 Din Mehmeti (1932–2010), Albanian poet from Kosovo
 Din Mohammad (born 1953), Afghani politician, writer and Pashtun tribal leader
 Din Thomas (born 1976), American mixed martial artist
 Din Djarin (born circa 28 BBY), the titular protagonist of the Disney+ television series The Mandalorian.

Surname
 Asif Din (born 1960), English cricketer
 Daniela Del Din (born 1969), Sammarinese sport shooter
 Fazal Din (1921–1945), Indian recipient of the Victoria Cross
 Gina Din (born 1961), East African businesswoman
 Haron Din (1940–2016), spiritual leader of the Pan-Malaysian Islamic Party
 Umar Din (r. 1526–1553), Sultan of the Sultanate of Ada

Arabic given names
Arabic-language surnames